Prey is a 2007 South African thriller film written by Jeff Wadlow, Beau Bauman, and Darrell Roodt. The film was directed by Roodt. At a South African game reserve, a woman and her two stepchildren are trapped inside a car by a pack of hungry lions. Prey stars Bridget Moynahan, Peter Weller and Carly Schroeder.

Plot
Tom Newman, a hydro-electrical engineer, arrives in South Africa with his family to help build a dam. His daughter, Jessica, isn't getting along with her stepmother, Amy, because she is not happy about her parents' divorce. The next morning, Amy, Jessica and her brother David go on a game drive with Brian, a ranger, while Tom goes to the dam. While driving off-road, David asks the ranger to stop the jeep because he has to defecate. Brian grabs his rifle and escorts David to a nearby tree. They encounter two lionesses, backed by a lion behind them. One lioness attacks and David runs back to the car, where Brian sacrifices himself to save the others. The keys lost, Amy, Jessica, and David are trapped in the car and stalked by the lions, who devour Brian.

Back at the lodge, Tom is informed of his family's disappearance, and attempts to contact Crawford, a professional hunter and guide, at the suggestion of the park rangers. Crawford refuses to help him, as he is a big five hunt guide, not a leader of search parties. The next day, after not being able to accompany the rangers in the air, Tom goes to see Crawford, and manages to hire his services at the latter's own price. Back in the car, David spots Brian's keys, and Amy retrieves them, only to wreck the truck when she drives the wrong way. Crawford and Tom look for signs of them while checking in on the rangers trail periodically, but the rain the previous night has washed away any tracks. When the rangers fly by without noticing them, Jessica gets out and tries to draw their attention. She fails and, along with Amy, is attacked by one lioness, which is killed by two native hunters.

Amy and Jessica manage to sign well enough to convince the hunters that they need water, and one leads Jessica to a watering hole nearby. They hear a gunshot and rush back, where the second hunter had been attacked and killed off-screen by the remaining pride members. The first goes to find his friend, and Jessica provides Amy and David with water.

Tom and Crawford locate lion dung, which indicates that it had eaten and was far away, before setting up camp. After dark, Tom and Crawford discuss lions at the fire, and Amy and Jessica discuss how she met Tom back in the car. The hunter comes back and is killed when the lion smashes through the window and drags him out. The next day, Amy, Jessica, and David resolve to survive with what they have and list what that is, and Crawford and Tom find the bones of one of the pride's previous victims.

Crawford and Tom's trail goes cold and he says they'll pitch and start west tomorrow, with Tom disagreeing. Amy gets out of the car, having heard Crawford's car, and begins to call out. Crawford and Tom run to the top of the hill. Crawford senses something is wrong, but Tom rushes down ahead of him, and is confronted by the last lioness. Before she can kill him, Crawford shoots the lioness through the heart. Tom makes it to the car, but on his way up, Crawford is attacked and killed by the lion. Tom crawls under the car and Amy breaks open the gas tank, telling Tom, Jessica, and David to run when she says so. Amy draws the lion's attention, and they dash for a tree as it jumps into the car. Amy lights a cloth fuse with her lighter and causes the truck to explode and kill the lion. Tom believes Amy is dead, but she appears beside the fire, and after Jessica finally acknowledges Amy as her mother, they all head back to Crawford's car to return to the lodge as the camera focuses on the savannah grass.

Cast
 Bridget Moynahan as Amy Newman
 Peter Weller as Tom Newman
 Carly Schroeder as Jessica Newman
 Jamie Bartlett as Crawford
 Conner Dowds as David Newman
 Marius Roberts as Brian
 Muso Sefatsa  as Nephew
 Tumisho K. Masha as Ranger at Airport
 Jacob Makgoba as Local Hunter

Production
The film was inspired by the true story of the Tsavo Man-Eaters during the colonial era. It was filmed on location in Gauteng and Limpopo in South Africa.

Soundtrack
The soundtrack is include Ron Brettel with "Awaken" and "Zulu Jive" by Urban Rhythm Factory. American synth-pop artist Tony Humecke composed the official score.

Reception

Critical response
Paul A. Newman of PNselling wrote in his review: "A bad, bad movie with a cool concept. Really bad. In fact I'm debating recutting the movie and changing the dialog and renaming it as "Prey, Pray, Pway" and releasing it as a comedy because this movie is really, really close to being hilarious."

Release
Prey premiered on 3 November 2006 as part of the American Film Market. The film was released on DVD on 30 January 2007, by The Weinstein Company. Prey was released on DVD in Europe on 10 November 2007, by Sony Pictures Home Entertainment.

References

External links 
 
 

2007 films
2007 horror films
2000s adventure films
2000s horror thriller films
Films about lions
Horror films based on actual events
Films set in Africa
Films shot in Gauteng
Films shot in South Africa
Adventure horror films
South African thriller films
South African horror films
South African adventure films
2000s English-language films
English-language South African films